गाँधी स्मारक महाविधालय is a college in Rajesultanpur in the Ambedkar Nagar district of Uttar Pradesh, India. The college is affiliated to Sampurnanand Sanskrit University,  offering undergraduate courses.

Departments

Arts

Sansakrit
Hindi
History
Political Science
Philosophy
Education

Accreditation
The college is also recognized by the University Grants Commission (UGC).and (PGC)

References

Sanskrit universities in India
Colleges in Ambedkar Nagar district
Rajesultanpur
Educational institutions established in 1958
1958 establishments in Uttar Pradesh
Sampurnanand Sanskrit Vishwavidyalaya